Xu Shixiao (born 16 February 1992) is a Chinese Sprint canoeist. She won the gold medal with her teammate Sun Mengya  in women's C-2 500 metres at 2020 Summer Olympics In Tokyo on 7 August 2021.

Career 
She studied at Jiangxi Normal University.

She competed at the 2018 ICF Canoe Sprint World Championships, and won a gold medal at the 2019 ICF Canoe Sprint World Championships.

She qualified for the 2020 Summer Olympics, where she and her partner Sun Mengya won the gold medal in women's C-2 500 metres in the event's debut on the Olympic stage, which replaced the men's K-2 200 metres as the Olympics moves toward gender equality.

References

1992 births
Living people
Chinese female canoeists
ICF Canoe Sprint World Championships medalists in Canadian
Olympic canoeists of China
Canoeists at the 2020 Summer Olympics
Medalists at the 2020 Summer Olympics
Olympic gold medalists for China
Olympic medalists in canoeing